"Angst" (German for Fear) is a song by German industrial metal band Rammstein, released as the fourth single from their eighth studio album Zeit.

A music video for the song was released on 29 April 2022, the same day as its parent studio album.

Background 
According to a track by track review of the lyrics by Oxford University Professor of Modern German Literature Karen Leeder, Angst is a song about the fear of the unknown, and the escalation of what that fear brings with it. Leeder goes onto state: 'The song has its roots in an eighteenth-century German playground game, Black Man, a game bound up in folklore and plague history, and there are more hints of Goethe's famous ‘Erlkönig’ (‘King of the Elves’) poem'

Music video 
On 27 April 2022, a 30-second teaser was released two days before the release of the music video.

At the beginning the music video shows the six band members in a circular plot of land of equal size, everyone gets along well with each other. Frontman Till Lindemann is brought to a lectern by ghastly made-up cheerleaders in a straitjacket and hooked up to hoses, after which he begins addressing an unshown crowd. Gradually, the band members are increasingly skeptical about their environment and fellow human beings, which is why they erect walls, install video cameras, roll out barbed wire and use assault rifles. In the meantime, the band members are also shown sitting in front of computer monitors and literally absorbing the content. As the musicians point their guns at the monitors located on the small "plots" of the circle, towards the end, a black hole opens up, engulfing the group. Interspersed are scenes of the cheerleaders, who move rhythmically towards the camera in a triangle formation, possibly based on the traditional New Zealand Haka dance. Also before the music starts and at the end of the video, a young woman and a girl are seen wrapped in blankets and surrounded by barbed wire. During the end credits, Till Lindenmann smashed the televisión set while the other band members watched.

Critical reception 
Consequence Sound gave "Angst" a positive review by giving it their song of the week honour. John Hadusek stated: 'Angst is a metallic crusher, structured around a tight central riff that drives forward. Meanwhile, ominous chorus chants and the imitably deep voice of frontman Till Lindemann are layered amongst the sonic fray.'. While Jack Rogers, writing for Rock Sounds states that 'It's a unique look at the way that we consume media and what it does to us, whilst also being incredibly dark and discomforting'.

Track listing

Charts

References

2022 songs
Rammstein songs